was a Japanese actor who appeared in eleven of Akira Kurosawa's films, including Rashomon, Seven Samurai, Throne of Blood, and The Hidden Fortress. He was also one of Kon Ichikawa's favorite actors.

He attended, but did not graduate from, Chuo University. Later in his career, he appeared as a secondary actor in many Toei films. In 1986, he was given the Best Actor prize at the Japan Academy Prize ceremony for his performance in Toei's Gray Sunset (1985).

He died of cardiac and pulmonary failure at age 82. His son Katsuhiko Sasaki is also an actor.

Filmography

Film

Stray Dog (1949) - Girlie Show director
Rashōmon (1950) - Priest
Nanairo no hana (1950) - Tahei Izumi
Koi no Oranda-zaka (1951) - Suekichi
The Idiot (1951) - Mutsuo Kayama, the secretary
Araki Mataemon: Kettô kagiya no tsuji (1952) 
Mōjū tsukai no shōjo (1952)
Bijo to touzoku (1952) - Takeichi no Takamaru
Kyô wa kaisha no gekkyûbi (1952) - Chief of General Affairs
Ikiru (1952) - Noguchi
Mogura yokochô (1953)
Seven Samurai (1954) - Heihachi Hayashida, one of the samurai
Shunkin monogatari (1954) - Teizo
Kakute yume ari (1954) - Sensuke Nasu
Saizansu nitôryû (1954) - Kojirô Sasaki / Daijirô - His son / Danjûrô - Travelling actor
Godzilla Raids Again (1955) - Kobayashi
Ryanko no Yatarô (1955) - Gozematsu
Kaettekita wakadan'na (1955) - Igarashi
I Live in Fear (1955) - Jiro Nakajima
Jirochô yûkyôden: amagi garasu (1955)
Samurai III: Duel at Ganryu Island (1956) - Sasuke the boatman
Kyûketsu-ga (1956) - Sango Kawase
A Wife's Heart (1956) - Zenichi
Narazu-mono (1956) - Sobei
Gendai no yokubô (1956) - Mikami
Oshidori no mon (1956)
Oshaberi shacho (1957)
Throne Of Blood (1957) - Yoshiaki Miki
Ujô (1957) - Kenkichi Tanabe
Sanjûrokunin no jôkyaku (1957) - Motohashi - Drug Salesman
Hikage no musume (1957)
Tôhoku no zunmu-tachi (1957) - Tasuke
The Lower Depths (Kurosawa) (1957) - Tonosama - the former Samurai
Hadairo no tsuki (1957) - Umekichi Ishikura
Ninjutsu suikoden inazuma kotengu (1958)
Futari dake no hashi (1958) - Kaikichi Ishida
Anzukko (1958) - Saburo Yoshida
Uguisu-jô no hanayome (1958)
Hana no bojô (1958) - Fukuzô Yanami
The Hidden Fortress (1958) - Tahei
Oshaberi okusan (1959)
Sengoku gunto-den (1959) - Jibu
Naniwa no koi no monogatari (1959)
Anyakôro (1959) - Nobuyuki Tokito
The Human Condition (1959) - Onodera Heichô
Sâtsu rarete tama ruka (I) (1960)
Mito Komon 3: All Star Version (1960)
Case of a Young Lord 8 (1960) - Sasajima Toshizo
Shinran (1960) - Seizenbo
Yôtô monogatari: hana no Yoshiwara hyakunin-giri (1960) - Jôsuke
Shirakoya Komako (1960) - Matashirô
Zoku shinran (1960)
Yatarô gasa (1960) - Kichitaro
Gen to fudômyô-ô (1961)
Hadakakko (1961) - Sandwich man
Ashita aru kagiri (1962)
The Inheritance (1962) - Junichi Fujii
Amakusa Shirô Tokisada (1962) - Sôho Tanaka
Love Under the Crucifix
Chiisakobe (1962) - Dairoku
Kigeki: Detatoko shôbu - 'Chinjarara monogatari' yori (1962) - Tarô Yamada
Hibari Chiemi no Yaji Kita Dochu (1963)
Hibari Chiemi no oshidori senryô gasa (1963)
High and Low (1963) - Journalist
Uogashi no sempû musume (1963)
Gobanchô yûgirirô (1963) - Takematsu
Brave Records of the Sanada Clan (1963) - Yukimura Sanada
Rojingai no kaoyaku (1963) - Fujimura Genzaemon
The Body (1964) - Sasaki
Samé (1964) - Shirosa
Kono sora no aru kagiri (1964) - Ryûtarô Nogami
Taking The Castle (1965) - Sanai
Hiya-meshi to Osan to Chan (1965) - Nakagawa (episode 1)
Zero faita dai kûsen (1966)
The Face of Another (1966) - Apartment Superintendent 
Lake of Tears (1966) - Kidayu Momose
Hatamoto yakuza (1966)
Ai no Sanka (1967) - The Ship-master
Sei no kigen (1967) - Girl's father
Nippon ichi no danzetsu otoko (1969) - Shimizu
Yoru no isoginchaku (1970) - Pastor
Karafuto 1945 Summer Hyosetsu no mon (1974) - Planter
Kyojin-gun monogatari: Susume eikô e (1977)
Tokugawa ichizoku no houkai (1980)
Gray Sunset (Hana Ichimonme) (1985) - Fuyukichi Takano
Don Matsugorô no daibôken (1987) - Amenomori Seikai (final film role)

Television
Kunitori Monogatari (1973) - Oda Nobuhide
Edo no Kaze (1975)
Sekigahara (1981) - Yamauchi Kazutoyo

Honours 
Order of the Sacred Treasure, 4th Class, Gold Rays with Rosette (1989)

References

External links

 
 

1917 births
1999 deaths
Actors from Hokkaido
Japanese male film actors
20th-century Japanese male actors
Chuo University alumni